The Office of the Prime Minister (Abrv: OPM;) is the central executive agency in the Government of the Kingdom of Thailand. It is classified as a cabinet department and is led by a permanent secretary. Its main responsibility is to assist the Prime Minister of Thailand in the role of head of government and chair of the Cabinet of Thailand.

Function
As the central executive agency, the Office of the Prime Minister is in charge of the coordination and management of the executive branch of the government of Thailand. It assists prime ministers in the execution of their duties and helps them manage and formulate policies. It also acts as the cabinet office, recording and assisting the cabinet as a central functioning organ of the government. The prime minister must appoint a permanent secretary in charge, who is also a member of the cabinet, to oversee its operations. It also houses the offices of the various deputy prime ministers of Thailand. The office is located in the Government House Complex, in Dusit, Bangkok.

In late 2016, the OPM acquired an additional function: as a "holding pen" for government officials accused of corruption. Former Prime Minister Prayut Chan-o-cha invoked his special powers under Section 44 of the interim charter to create 50 posts at the OPM for civil servants being investigated for alleged wrongdoing. Transferred officials will continue to receive their salaries.

Budget
The OPM budget for fiscal year 2019 (FY2019) (1 October 2018–30 September 2019) is 41.216.2 million baht. Its budget was 36,001.3 million baht in FY2016, 35,412.3 million baht in FY2017, and 34,256.5 million baht in FY2018.

Departments

Departments
Office of the Permanent Secretary
The Government Public Relations Department (PRD)
The Office of the Consumer Protection Board

Agencies directly under the Prime Minister
For list, see Thailand's Budget in Brief Fiscal Year 2019.

Secretariat to the Prime Minister
Secretariat to the Cabinet
National Reconciliation Commission
Royal Gazette
National Intelligence Agency
 Budget Bureau 
Office of the National Security Council
Office of the Council of State
Office of the Civil Service Commission
Office of the National Economic and Social Development Council
Office of Public Sector Development Commission
Office of the Board of Investment (BOI)
 Office of the National Water Resources (ONWR)
Office of the National Land Policy

Regulatory agencies under the Office of the Prime Minister
Internal Security Operations Command (ISOC)
Maritime Enforcement Command Center (MECC)
Southern Border Provinces Administration Centre (SBPAC)

State enterprises
MCOT Public Company Limited (Formerly known as Mass Communications Organization of Thailand)

Agencies or departments under the Prime Minister's command
 National Office of Buddhism
 Office of the Royal Development Projects Board
 Royal Society of Thailand
 Royal Thai Police
 Anti-Money Laundering Office
 Southern Border Provinces Administration Centre
 Office of Public Sector Anti-Corruption Commission
 National Village and Urban Community Fund Office
 Office of Thai Health Promotion Foundation
 Equitable Education Fund
 Eastern Economic Corridor Office

Public organisations
 Designated Areas for Sustainable Tourism Administration
 Digital Government Development Agency
 The Land Bank Administration Institute
 The Office for National Education Standards and Quality Assessment
 Office of Knowledge Management and Development
 Pinkanakorn Development Agency
 Thai Public Broadcasting Service (TPBS)
 Thailand Convention and Exhibition Bureau (TCEB)
 Thailand Professional Qualification Institute 
 The Thailand Research Fund
 The Office of Small and Medium Enterprises Promotion (OSMEP)

See also
Prime Minister of Thailand
Cabinet of Thailand
List of Government Ministers of Thailand
Government of Thailand

References

External links
The Prime Minister's Office website
The Secretariat of The Cabinet website

 
Government ministries of Thailand
Cabinet departments